John Lowrie Morrison  (born 1948, Maryhill, Glasgow), known as Jolomo, is a Scottish contemporary artist, producing expressionist oil paintings of Scottish landscapes.

Career
He became interested in art at an early age, copying chocolate box pictures that his mother brought home from work, and painting on school art trips and family holidays. He attended Glasgow School of Art, from 1967 to 1971. He was forced to make a choice between making abstract designs for fashion and landscape painting and chose the latter. While his classmates favoured pop art and abstraction, he developed an expressionist style, influenced by artists such as Kokoschka, Chagall and Soutine.

He taught art for more than twenty years at Lochgilphead High School, appointed along the way as art adviser for Strathclyde, and only became a full-time artist in 1996. He was awarded an honorary degree by Abertay University in 2009  and was appointed Officer of the Order of the British Empire (OBE) in the 2011 New Year Honours for services to art and charity in Scotland.

Morrison produces about 100 paintings per month, completing three or four per day, six days a week. They sell very quickly, generating £2 million per year. As well as local buyers, he is patronised by celebrities such as Sting, Madonna, Simon Le Bon, Sophia Loren, Chris Patten and Rick Stein. His work is considered by some to be gaudy, while others describe it as unusual and vivid.

He completes the majority of his paintings in his studio, based on sketches and photographs. He also researches the history, folklore and geology of a place.

Jolomo Award

He founded the Jolomo Award in 2007 - the prestigious annual award for Scottish Landscape Painting. It is the largest arts award in Scotland and the UK's largest privately funded arts award with a prize currently of £25,000 for the winner, and £35,000 for all the prizes.

Personal life
Morrison lives in Tayvallich, Argyll, with his wife Maureen, whom he met while he was doing a student job in a design studio of a local carpet factory. They have three sons, Callum, Peter and Simon.

He is a devout Presbyterian.

References

External links
 Official website
 Jolomo Awards
 2008 exhibition with many of his paintings

Scottish contemporary artists
Artists from Glasgow
Alumni of the Glasgow School of Art
Alumni of the University of Strathclyde
Scottish schoolteachers
1948 births
Living people
Officers of the Order of the British Empire
British landscape painters
Expressionist painters
20th-century Scottish educators
20th-century Scottish painters
21st-century Scottish educators
21st-century Scottish painters
21st-century Scottish male artists
People from Maryhill
Scottish Presbyterians